Ulva laingii is a species of seaweed in the family Ulvaceae that can be found in Australia and New Zealand.

References

Further reading

Ulvaceae
Plants described in 1956